Sursuvul Point (‘Nos Sursuvul’ \'nos sur-su-'vul\) is the rocky point on Davis Coast in Graham Land, Antarctica projecting 300 m northwards into Orléans Strait. The point is named after Georgi Sursuvul, first minister and regent of Bulgaria during the reigns of Czar Simeon the Great and Czar Peter I (9th-10th century).

Location
British mapping in 1978.

Maps
British Antarctic Territory. Scale 1:200000 topographic map. DOS 610 Series, Sheet W 64 60. Directorate of Overseas Surveys, Tolworth, UK, 1978.
 Antarctic Digital Database (ADD). Scale 1:250000 topographic map of Antarctica. Scientific Committee on Antarctic Research (SCAR). Since 1993, regularly upgraded and updated.

References
 Bulgarian Antarctic Gazetteer. Antarctic Place-names Commission. (details in Bulgarian, basic data in English)
Sursuvul Point. SCAR Composite Antarctic Gazetteer.

External links
 Sursuvul Point. Copernix satellite image

Headlands of Graham Land
Davis Coast
Bulgaria and the Antarctic